Kanamala Bridge is a concrete bridge in Kanamala, Kerala that connects Kottayam and Pathanamthitta districts through Pamba River. The bridge was opened for public on 23 December 2014.

The bridge has a length of 170 m (560 ft) and width of 11.23 m (36.8 ft).

References

Bridges in Kerala